Schneewittchen  is an East German film. It was released in 1962. The film's plot is quite similar to the Grimm's version, and the changes made to the film can be compared to the Walt Disney film from 1937.

The picture sold 7,597,495 tickets.

References

External links
 https://www.imdb.com/title/tt1343987/

1962 films
1960s fantasy films
German fantasy films
German children's films
East German films
1960s German-language films
Films based on Snow White
Films directed by Gottfried Kolditz
1960s German films